Players and pairs who neither have high enough rankings nor receive wild cards may participate in a qualifying tournament held one week before the annual Wimbledon Tennis Championships.

Seeds

  Hsieh Su-wei /  Alla Kudryavtseva (qualified)
  Chan Chin-wei /  Tetiana Luzhanska (first round)
  Stéphanie Foretz /  Selima Sfar (qualified)
  Līga Dekmeijere /  Shikha Uberoi (first round)
  Julie Ditty /  Raquel Kops-Jones (qualified)
  Leanne Baker /  Nicole Kriz (first round)
  Eva Birnerová /  Julia Schruff (first round)
  Akgul Amanmuradova /  Varvara Lepchenko (first round)

Qualifiers

  Hsieh Su-wei /  Alla Kudryavtseva
  Julie Ditty /  Raquel Kops-Jones
  Stéphanie Foretz /  Selima Sfar
  Sofia Arvidsson /  Lilia Osterloh

Lucky losers

  Andrea Hlaváčková /  Sandra Klösel
  Hana Šromová /  Klára Zakopalová
  Anna Fitzpatrick /  Emily Webley-Smith

Qualifying draw

First qualifier

Second qualifier

Third qualifier

Fourth qualifier

External links

2007 Wimbledon Championships on WTAtennis.com
2007 Wimbledon Championships – Women's draws and results at the International Tennis Federation

Women's Doubles Qualifying
Wimbledon Championship by year – Women's doubles qualifying
Wimbledon Championships